Michael Alex Conley Sr. (born October 5, 1962) is an American former track and field athlete who competed primarily in the triple jump and the long jump. In the triple jump, he won an Olympic gold medal in 1992, silver in 1984, and gold in the 1993 World Championship.

Conley's son, Mike Conley Jr., is a professional basketball player in the National Basketball Association (NBA).

Competitive career
Conley competed collegiately at the University of Arkansas where he won 9 NCAA long jump and triple jump titles. Conley was ranked #1 in the United States 9 times in the triple jump during his professional career. Conley is the former world indoor triple jump record holder and he still holds the U.S. indoor record in the triple jump at 17.76 meters (58 feet, 3.25 inches).

Conley was ranked #1 in the world 6 times in the Triple Jump during his career and was ranked 8th in the U.S. in the 200 meter dash in 1985.
Conley received the USATF Jim Thorpe Award in 1986 and 1992 as the top field events athlete in the U.S.  In 2004, Conley was inducted into the United States National Track and Field Hall of Fame.

A  basketball player at the point guard position in Luther High School South in Chicago and in college (only during his freshman year), Conley relied on those skills in winning the Foot Locker Celebrity Slam Dunk Contest in 1988, 1989 and 1992, where he also made the longest dunk ever, a dunk from 2" behind the free-throw line in the final against Olympic long jumper, Mike Powell.

Post-competitive career
Conley was president and remains on the board of directors of World Sport Chicago, the "living legacy" of Chicago's 2016 Olympic and Paralympic Bid, that focuses on promoting and developing sport programs and events for the youth of Chicago. Chicago had been selected as the U.S. entry into the bid process. Previously, he was the executive director of Elite Athlete's program for USA Track and Field.

Conley is presently serving as chairman on the High Performance committee for USATF.

Conley is also CEO of (MMG) a Sports Management Group as well as CEO of hydrogen-infused water company HTWO.

Conley is registered with the NBA as an agent and represented his son, Mike Conley Jr., and his son's Ohio State teammates Greg Oden and Daequan Cook when they entered the league and currently represents fellow University of Arkansas alum Isaiah Joe of the Oklahoma City Thunder.
Oden officially declared for the NBA draft by signing with Mike Sr. as his agent and was subsequently chosen as the number one player in the 2007 NBA Draft. Conley Jr. was selected fourth overall. Cook was drafted 21st.

Rankings
Conley had a particularly long and prolific career and he was considered among the world's best for over a decade.  Track and Field News ranked him among the top ten triple jumpers in the world 14 consecutive years (six times as world's best) and seven times in the long jump.

Conley was ranked 8th in the U.S. in the 200 meter dash in 1985.

Personal life
Conley is married to René Corbin Conley and is the father of Utah Jazz point guard Mike Conley Jr., Jordan Conley, Sydney Conley (All-American long jumper at the University of Kansas), and Jon Conley. He is the elder brother of former American football linebacker Steve Conley.

References

External links

1962 births
Living people
African-American male track and field athletes
Arkansas Razorbacks men's basketball players
Arkansas Razorbacks men's track and field athletes
American male triple jumpers
American male long jumpers
American sports agents
Athletes (track and field) at the 1987 Pan American Games
Athletes (track and field) at the 1984 Summer Olympics
Athletes (track and field) at the 1992 Summer Olympics
Athletes (track and field) at the 1996 Summer Olympics
Medalists at the 1984 Summer Olympics
Medalists at the 1992 Summer Olympics
Olympic gold medalists for the United States in track and field
Olympic silver medalists for the United States in track and field
Pan American Games gold medalists for the United States
Track and field athletes from Chicago
University of Arkansas alumni
World Athletics Championships athletes for the United States
World Athletics Championships medalists
Pan American Games medalists in athletics (track and field)
Universiade medalists in athletics (track and field)
Goodwill Games medalists in athletics
American men's basketball players
Universiade silver medalists for the United States
Point guards
World Athletics Indoor Championships winners
World Athletics Indoor Championships medalists
World Athletics Championships winners
Competitors at the 1986 Goodwill Games
Competitors at the 1990 Goodwill Games
Competitors at the 1994 Goodwill Games
Medalists at the 1987 Pan American Games
21st-century African-American people
20th-century African-American sportspeople